David Jerome Wasson (born September 11, 1968) is an American animator, storyboard artist, director, producer, writer, and voice actor. He graduated from the California Institute of the Arts with a B.F.A. Wasson created the Cartoon Network original series Time Squad, before going on to develop Star vs. the Forces of Evil on which he is also a director, writer, and executive producer, and directing and writing on the series Mickey Mouse Shorts. He was the supervising director of Making Fiends and was the executive producer and director of the series The Buzz on Maggie. He is also the author and illustrator of the children's book The Big Ideas of Buster Bickles. Wasson is currently developer and executive producer of The Cuphead Show! for Netflix.

Career
Wasson created the animated series Time Squad at Cartoon Network. He has co-written, storyboarded, and directed a number of the shorts for the series Mickey Mouse Shorts. Wasson was the supervising director, supervising producer, and voice actor on Making Fiends. He was the executive producer and director of The Buzz on Maggie at Disney. Wasson also created a series of shorts at Nickelodeon for Oh Yeah! Cartoons one of which, Max and His Special Problem, won him an Emmy Award in 1999 for Production Designer. He has also directed many animated commercials for the company Acme Filmworks located in Hollywood, California.

Credits

Television
 Catschool - Supervising Director, Executive producer, Storyboard Artist
The Buzz on Maggie - Director, Executive Producer
 Making Fiends - Director, Supervising Director, Supervising Producer, Art Director, Voice actor
 Mickey Mouse - Director, Writer, Storyboard Artist
 Mighty Mouse: The New Adventures - Layout
 Oh Yeah! Cartoons - Creator, Director, Writer, Art Director ("Max and His Special Problem", "Tales from the Goose Lady")
 Star vs. the Forces of Evil - Developed by, Story by, Supervising Director, Executive Producer
 Time Squad - Creator, Director, Executive Producer, Writer
 What a Cartoon! - Character Layout ("Buy One, Get One Free")
 The Mighty B!  - Character Designer
 The Cuphead Show! - Creator, Developed by, Executive Producer, Writer, Theme Song Composer

Movies
 Cloudy with a Chance of Meatballs - Animator
 Cool World - Animator, Character Layout, Character Design
 Down with Love - Animation Director, Title Sequence
 Space Jam - Animator

Voice acting
 Making Fiends - Additional voices
 Mickey Mouse - Additional voices
 Oh Yeah! Cartoons - Max
 The Cuphead Show! - Henchman, Mr. Telephone, Muffin Ice Cream Man

References

External links
 
Dave Wasson on Acme Filmworks
 

1968 births
Living people
People from Hot Springs, Arkansas
American art directors
American male screenwriters
American male voice actors
American television directors
American television producers
American television writers
American male television writers
Animators from Arkansas
American storyboard artists
California Institute of the Arts alumni
American animated film directors
American animated film producers
Disney Television Animation people
Cartoon Network Studios people
Nickelodeon Animation Studio people
Annie Award winners